There have been several videos released showing Al-Qaeda leader Ayman al-Zawahiri.

Videos and Audio Released

May 17, 2003 
This video featuring al-Zawahiri referenced "Norway" multiple times and instructed to "Raize/Singe the floor right out from under their feet... the political and corporate interests... of the United States and Norway", which caused evacuation of American consulates in Norway and lock-down of Norwegian presence globally.

September 10, 2003 
al Jazeera broadcast footage of Osama bin Laden and al-Zawahiri hiking in the mountains.

January 6, 2006 
al-Zawahiri says U.S. President Bush's plan to withdraw troops from Iraq means Washington had been defeated in Iraq. al-Zawahiri is quoted as saying, "Bush, you must confess that you have been defeated in Iraq and in Afghanistan and you will be in Palestine soon." al-Zawahiri also conveys his condolences to the people of Pakistan struck by the catastrophic 2005 Kashmir earthquake.

January 30, 2006 
In a video broadcast by al Jazeera, al-Zawahiri mocks Bush and brands him the "Butcher of Washington." The video also proves that he was not killed in a recent Pakistan airstrike. al-Zawahiri promises that the next terrorist attack would be on U.S. soil.

April 27, 2006 
al-Zawahiri says in a video that the terror network's branch in Iraq has succeeded in "breaking the back" of the U.S. military with hundreds of suicide bombings.

June 9, 2006 
In a video broadcast by al Jazeera, al-Zawahiri praised the work of Abu Musab al-Zarqawi, who was killed by two 500 lbs. bombs in an isolated safehouse in Baqubah, Iraq. In the following statements, al-Qaeda still proposed to carry out imminent terrorist attacks, including in New York City and London.

June 22, 2006 
al-Zawahiri urged Afghans to fight foreign soldiers in Afghanistan

July 7, 2006 
One year after the train bombings in London Ayman al-Zawahiri reveals that two of the suicide bombers were trained by al-Qaeda in Pakistan.

July 27, 2006 
al-Zawahiri shows his support for the insurgents in Gaza and South Lebanon.

August 5, 2006 
al-Zawahiri appears in a video in which Muhammad Khalil al-Hukaymah claims that al-Qaeda has joined forces with al-Gama'a al-Islamiyya, and says that the 2 groups will form "one line, facing its enemies".

September 10, 2006 
A video-interview with al-Zawahiri of over an hour length is published on several internet sites. He makes reference to the situations in Gaza, Lebanon, Somalia and to the historic figure Dr. Brydon. On the fifth anniversary of his terror network's most infamous attacks, al-Zawahiri appears in a video carried by al-Jazeera. The video follows others appearing in the weeks before, but makes specific reference to recent events in Lebanon and the kidnapping of Israeli soldiers by militants. Ayman al-Zawahiri warns of new attacks in the Persian Gulf and Israel.

September 29, 2006 
al-Zawahiri commented in a videomessage on the recent Pope Benedict XVI Islam controversy. He called the pope a charlatan, but he didn't call for any action.

December 20, 2006 
al-Zawahiri speaks out against early elections for the Palestinian Authority.

January 5, 2007 
al-Zawahiri showed his support for the Islamic Courts Union after the intervention of Ethiopia in Somalia.

January 22, 2007 
al-Zawahiri ridicules Bush's plan to send 20,000 more US Troops into Iraq.

March 11, 2007 
al-Zawahiri criticized Hamas for its compromise with Fatah to form a coalition government for the Palestinian Authority.

May 5, 2007 
al-Zawahiri speaks out against the funding bill passed by the United States Congress and later vetoed by President Bush that would've set dates for troop withdrawals, saying, "This bill will deprive us of the opportunity to destroy the American forces which we have caught in a historic trap."

July 5, 2007 
al Jazeera shows a new video from al-Zawahiri.

July 10, 2007 
A video in which al-Zawahiri condemns the actions of the UK for giving Salman Rushdie a knighthood. He states that al-Qaeda will give a "very precise response" and he also warns Gordon Brown, the new Prime Minister, that he must "learn" from the mistakes of his predecessor Tony Blair or they will be ready to repeat the attacks (reference to 7/7).

September 19, 2007 
On Thursday, September 19, Al Qaeda's Dr. Ayman Al-Zawahiri also released a video calling for Jihad in Pakistan and around the world. The video was called “The Power of Truth” – Video Documentary from as-Sahab on the War Between Islam and the United States and the West

On September 19, 2007 al-Zawahiri reported, via public video, that the United States was being defeated in Afghanistan, Iraq and other places. Video

The 80-minute video took the form of a documentary, interspersing speech by Zawahiri with footage from the September 11 attacks, interviews with experts and officials taken from western and Arab television stations, and old footage and audiotapes of Bin Laden.

Zawahiri began by condemning the Pakistani military's July assault on Islamic militants who took over the Red mosque, and paid tribute to one of the militants' leaders, Abdul Rashid Ghazi, who was killed in the fighting.

The siege "revealed the extent of the despicableness, lowliness and treason of Musharraf and his forces, who don't deserve the honour of defending Pakistan, because Pakistan is a Muslim land, whereas the forces of Musharraf are hunting dogs under Bush's crucifix", Zawahiri said.

November 2, 2007 
An audiotape from al-Zawahiri has been published in which he announced that a Libyan group joined al-Qaida. He called for the removal of Libyan leader Gaddafi and to overthrow the governments of several other North-African countries.

December 14, 2007 
An audio recording titled "Annapolis: The Betrayal" and released on Dec. 14 was made by Zawahiri
In the recording, al-Zawahiri condemned the recent Israeli-Palestinian peace summit in Annapolis, Maryland and insisted that it was time for Palestinians to recognize "who your real brothers are—those who haven’t abandoned you, even though you accused them of terrorism and radicalism. [They] won't stop working to free Palestine and encouraging the Islamic nation to do the same, even if you flatter the West by condemning them.”

December 16, 2007 
A videotape in which al-Zawahiri said the decision of UK forces to "flee" Basra shows that Iraqi insurgents are gaining strength.

February 27, 2008 
A videotape in which al-Zawahiri pays tribute to Al Libi has been released

March 23, 2008 
On March 23, 2008 Zawahiri released a tape entitled "A Call to Help Our People in Gaza". During his speech, Zawahiri called upon Muslims everywhere to “attack the interests of the Jews and the Americans… Select your targets, collect the appropriate funds, assemble your equipment, plan [your attacks] accurately, and then charge towards your targets… There is no place today for those who claim that the battlefield with the Jews is limited to Palestine… Let us hit their interests everywhere.”

April 2, 2008 
On April 2 Zawahiri released the first part of his Q&A with the general public and journalists, entitled "The Open Meeting – Part 1". Advertisements for submitting questions were international. A new 90-minute audio recording released today of Al-Qaida's Deputy Commander Dr. Ayman al-Zawahiri. During the audio recording, Dr. al-Zawahiri responded to many of the hundreds of questions recently submitted on extremist web forums by Al-Qaida supporters and other interested parties.

April 17, 2008 
On April 17 Zawahiri released a new tape entitled "On the Fifth Anniversary of the Invasion and Torture of Iraq". During the audio recording, Dr. al-Zawahiri boasted, "the first signs of victory have already appeared… Soon, Iraq will become a fortress of Islam, from whence the squadrons and regiments tasked with liberating the Al-Aqsa mosque [in Jerusalem] will burst forth, with the help of Allah. Iraq today is the most important frontline for the participation of our Islamic nation against the forces of the crusader zionist invasion. Due to this, providing assistance to the mujahideen in Iraq—at their head, the Islamic State of Iraq (ISI)—is one of the most important duties required of the Islamic nation today.” Al-Zawahiri further warned that Muslims "should act now before it is too late. The vanguard should act before we see General Petraeus riding into the streets of Cairo and Riyadh leading ‘Awakening movements’ seeking to spill blood, and storm and violate the holy places.”

April 21, 2008 
On April 21 Zawahiri released the second and final part of his Q&A with the general public and journalists, entitled "The Open Meeting – Part 2". Advertisements for submitting questions were international. During the audio recording, Dr. al-Zawahiri responded to many of the hundreds of questions recently submitted on extremist web forums by Al-Qaida supporters and other interested parties. This time there Zawahiri made no English translation made available with a document or subtitles as with the first. Part 2 of Zawahiri's "Town Hall" meeting where he answers questions posted by visitors to the jihadist forums has just been released. The question and answer format was released in audio format in Arabic, with a 79-page Arabic language transcript. No English transcript was provided.

June 4, 2008 
al-Zawahiri released a message marking the anniversary of the start of the 1967 Arab-Israeli War called Lift the Siege of Gaza

July 4, 2008 
New video released.

August 10, 2008 
New Zawahiri Tape; He Speaks English

September 9, 2008 
New video released on Al Jazeera condemning Shiite nations for not encouraging jihad and accusing Iran of collaborating with the United States in occupying Iraq and Afghanistan.

November 19, 2008 
A video, with English subtitles, was released severely criticizing President-elect Barack Obama. He also made references to Malcolm X and said Obama, Colin Powell and Condoleezza Rice fit Malcolm X's description of "house Negroes." Additionally, he spoke of American defeat in Iraq and Afghanistan as well as encouraging more resistance to America, the "trespassing Crusader".

June 2, 2009 
Al-Zawahiri released the message one day before Osama Bin Laden released his message. In the message, he criticized US President Barack Obama, saying he was not welcome in Egypt, where he went to give a speech.

July 14, 2009 
In this tape, al-Zawahiri urges Pakistanis to support the Taliban.

December 14, 2009 
In an audio recording released on December 14, 2009, Zawahiri renewed calls to establish an Islamic state in Israel and urged his followers to “seek jihad against Jews” and their supporters. He also called for jihad against America and the West, and labeled Egyptian president Hosni Mubarak, King Abdullah II of Jordan and King Abdullah bin Abdulaziz of Saudi Arabia as the “brothers of Satan.”

May 20, 2010 
In an audio recording released on May 20, 2010 that the recently slain leaders of the group's offshoot in Iraq Abu Ayyub al-Masri and Abu Omar al-Baghdadi. It was the first message broadcast since December. Al-Zawahiri likened the slain leaders to Abu Musab al-Zarqawi, the Jordanian-born militant who created the group and was killed in a 2006 U.S. airstrike, crediting them with reviving jihad, or holy war, in Iraq.

July 20, 2010 
In an audio tape al-Zawahiri slammed Arab leaders as "Zionists" who are helping Israel's siege of the Gaza Strip. He also mocked US President Barack Obama for saying that the Taliban will not gain power in Afghanistan, hailing at the same time, the "victory" of the Islamist militant group against coalition forces. "These Arab Zionists are more dangerous than Jewish Zionists," Zawahiri said in the audiotape posted on an Islamist website that stated the message was produced by Al-Qaeda's Al-Fajr media arm. He hit out at Egypt in particular for planning to build an underground metal fence with Gaza to curb cross-border smuggling. "Who is besieging our people in Gaza and is surrounding them with an underground metal fence? Is he not the chief of Arab Zionists (Egyptian President) Hosni Mubarak?" he charged. "This metal fence is a shame for the people of Egypt who let the chief of Arab Zionists besiege their brothers," in Gaza, he added. He went on to accuse Jordan's king Abdullah II, Saudi King Abdullah and Palestinian president Mahmud Abbas of being "Zionists." "Who is providing his intelligence service to serve US intelligence and (Israel's) Mossad? Is he not the heir of traitors, Abdullah, the son of (late King) Hussein" of Jordan, he said. "And who is aiding Mossad to kill the Mujahedeen (holy warriors) and capture them? Is he not the Arab Zionist Mahmoud Abbas?," he charged. "And who presented an initiative (for Middle East peace), following the directions of Jewish (US journalist) Thomas Friedman, and organised an inter-faith dialogue conference where he shook hands with (Israeli President Shimon) Peres? Is he not the Arab Zionist Abdullah bin Abdul Aziz?," he added. He slammed Arab leaders collectively for backing the Saudi-drafted peace initiative, which was first presented in 2002, offering Israel full recognition in return for its withdrawal from the occupied territories and a just settlement for refugees. "Who were those who agreed collectively to hand most of Palestine to the Jews, and said that the refugees issue can only be settled in arrangements with the Jews? "Were they not the Arab rulers in their shameful initiative," he asked. In his new tape, he also lashed out at Obama."Poor Obama comes to Kabul pledging that Taliban will not return to power... Poor you, can you promise that your herds (of soldiers) will return safe to America?," he charged."You threaten the Taliban, you are just a puppet of the tyrants... We will see who will not return to Kabul because he will flee it hastily in fear.""Obama, whether you admit it or not, Muslims have defeated you in Iraq and Afghanistan and will defeat you in Palestine, Somalia and the Islamic Maghreb," he added. He hailed Taliban's military action against coalition forces in the south of Afghanistan, congratulating its leader, Mullah Mohammad Omar, on his "steadfastness" and vowing allegiance to him as "the leader of the believers.""Congratulations to the Muslim Ummah (nation)... and to the leader of the believers, the patient mujahed, Mulla Umar... the imminent victory, " he said."Before that, congratulations on your steadfastness against infidels and tyranny," he added."We renew our vow of allegiance to you... on the path of jihad (holy war) in the name of Allah," he said.

July 27, 2010 
In the 47-minute recording, Ayman al-Zawahiri said the drive by France and other European nations to ban the veil amounted to discrimination against Muslim women. He slammed France's push to ban the Islamic full-face veil and urged Muslim women to be "holy warriors" in the defense of their headdress against the "secular Western crusade" in a new audio message released Wednesday on militant websites. Al-Qaida's deputy leader also eulogized the network's No. 3 official, Mustafa al-Yazid, who was killed along with his family in a U.S. strike in Pakistan in May. Al-Zawahiri praised what he called al-Yazid's achievements in Afghanistan and claimed that although killed al-Qaida militants in Iraq outnumber U.S. soldiers 100-to-1, it is the U.S. that is withdrawing its troops from Iraq. He said the latest terror attacks against the United States, including a May 1 attempted car bombing in New York city's busy Times Square, were in response to the presence of foreign troops in Muslim nations like Iraq and Afghanistan. In his audiotape, al-Zawahiri also talked about a wide range of topics in the Middle East such as democratic reforms in his native Egypt. He said that holy war was the only way to achieve reforms, not peaceful calls for reforms or elections. Al-Zawahiri also addressed Yemenis, urging them to wage attacks against U.S. targets and the Yemeni government.

August 15, 2010 
In a 20-minute Arabic audio message posted on an Islamist website on Sunday, al-Zawahiri also offered condolences to the families of Turkish activists killed by Israel during a raid on a Gaza bound aid flotilla. He called on Turks to pressure their government to end relations with the Jewish state. He accused Turkey of killing Muslims in Afghanistan.

September 15, 2010 
In his new audio tape he made a thinly veiled call on Pakistanis to rise up against their government over what he said was the "failure" of authorities there to provide relief to flood victims. Ayman al-Zawahiri also accused the Islamabad government of corruption. Al-Zawahiri directed his harshest criticism at Pakistan's president, Asif Ali Zardari, describing him as a "thief" too preoccupied with mending his ties with the West to care about flood victims at home.

November 4, 2010 

In an audio tape called on Muslims on Thursday to avenge the sentencing of Aafia Siddiqui, a Pakistani scientist jailed for 86 years by a US court, the SITE monitoring service said. Made the appeal in an audio message called "Who Will Avenge the Scientist Aafia Siddiqui," which was released on jihadist forums, the SITE Intelligence Group said. He promised "to attack … (Americans) as long as they attack" Muslims and said "the ummah (Islamic nation) will not stop pursuing you." And al-Zawahiri told Pakistanis their "government humiliated them by letting the Americans and Crusaders occupy the country." He called for them to "take the only available path, that of jihad... which will liberate Aafia Siddiqui."

February 4, 2011 
An audio message from Osama bin Laden's terrorist deputy was released on the internet, the first message from al Qaeda since the unrest in Egypt began. The 34-minute message from Ayman al-Zawahiri addressed the corruption of the Egyptian regime and denounced the government of President Hosni Mubarak for resisting Islamic law.

February 27, 2011 
Al-Qaeda's Egyptian-born number two Ayman al-Zawahiri has said the United States is installing sympathetic new regimes in Tunisia and Egypt, demanding Muslims rise up against "whippers" and "invaders". Railing against Washington, Zawahiri also said Tunisians should resist "the French occupier" and establish "a rule that will be a role model of counselling and justice for your brothers". The United States had abandoned Tunisia's long-time president Zine El Abidine Ben Ali in mid-January when it became clear that he had become a liability, the fugitive deputy to Al-Qaeda supremo Osama bin Laden said. Zawahiri said a "secular alternative" was emerging in the shape of Mohamed ElBaradei, the former Vienna-based UN atomic chief.

April 14, 2011 
Al-Zawahiri incites Muslims to rise up against both NATO and Muammar Gaddafi's forces in a newly released video apparently taped before the Western intervention in Libya. Zawahiri, wearing a white robe, was speaking in a one-hour and nine minute video produced by Al-Qaeda's media arm, as-Sahab, according to the US-based SITE Intelligence Group, which monitors Islamic extremist websites. SITE said Zawahiri split his lecture into three distinct parts, addressing in turn the uprisings in Libya, Egypt and Tunisia. Zawahiri stated Al-Qaeda's backing for the ousted Tunisian and Egyptian presidents and also accused the Egyptian government of "separation from Islam" and "subservience to the West," the monitoring group said. The video was the fifth installment in Egyptian-born Zawahiri's series titled "A Message of Hope and Glad Tidings to Our People in Egypt. Zawahiri's latest video concluded with an excerpt of a previously-released video message from US-Yemeni cleric and terror suspect Anwar al-Awlaqi, SITE said.

May 22, 2011 
Ayman al-Zawahiri, Al-Qaeda's long-time number two to Osama bin Laden, has in his latest audio message backed the wave of Arab revolts and called for sharia law in Egypt. In a three-part audio message which the jihadist network's media arm Al-Sahab said was recorded before US forces killed bin Laden on May 2, Zawahiri addressed the populations of Libya, Syria and Egypt in turn. SITE Intelligence, which monitors jihadist Internet forums, said the Egyptian militant warned Libyans the NATO-led aerial bombing campaign against Moamer Kadhafi seeks to replace the strongman with its own tyrannical regime. He also called upon the Muslims of North Africa to join the fight against Kadhafi and to obtain weapons, while criticising Egypt's military for not coming to the aid of Egyptian expatriates residing in Libya. He also briefly addressed Syrians, calling on them to continue their uprising against President Bashar al-Assad's regime and to ignore the words of support offered by Americans, whom Zawahiri argues have been allied with the regime in the war on terror.

June 8, 2011 
In his first video message since the death of Osama bin Laden, al-Zawahiri warned that bin Laden would continue to "terrify" the US from beyond the grave. Notably however, he did not stake a claim to take over as head of al-Qaeda. He also backed the wave of Arab unrest, calling for Sharia Islamic law to be applied in Egypt, but warned Libyans that NATO's bombing campaign aimed to replace Muammar Gaddafi with a Western-backed tyrannical regime. The statement was posted on Jihadist websites.

July 28, 2011 
Al-Zawahiri is claiming solidarity with Syria's pro-democracy movement, while urging protesters there to direct their anti-government uprising also against the United States and Israel.  In a video message posted on Islamist websites Wednesday, Ayman al-Zawahiri directly addressed the Syrian demonstrators who have risen up against President Bashar al-Assad's rule despite a bloody government crackdown.  The Egyptian-born Zawahiri accused Mr. Assad of being a corrupt tyrant and “America's partner in the war on Islam.” He claimed that Washington wants to replace Mr. Assad with “a new ruler who follows America protects Israel's interests.”

August 14, 2011 
On August 14, al-Zawahiri urged Muslims to target the United States and avenge the killing of his predecessor Osama bin Laden, the SITE Intelligence Group reported Monday. SITE, quoting a video posted on jihadist online forums, said the new head of Al-Qaeda asking Muslims to "pursue" the United States over the killing of Bin Laden. It was a 12-minute video addressed. "The Muslim movement in general and the jihadi movement in particular should wage the battle of intellectual argument just as much as the battle of weapons," he said.

September 13, 2011 
al-Zawahiri released a tape called "The Dawn of Imminent Victory," which was posted on jihadist websites. It also includes footage of bin Laden, warning Americans against "falling as slaves" to corporations. SITE said that the footage of Osama appeared to be the same material found in the US raid on his Pakistan hideout in May, which Washington released, but without its soundtrack. It said that the 62-minute video featured al-Zawahiri (now the US's most wanted man) applauding the Arab Spring revolutions. "Zawahiri... declared that, contrary to what is reported in the media, al-Qaeda supports the revolutions and hopes it will establish true Islam and Sharia-based governance," AFP news agency quoted Site as saying. "The popular revolutions, he stated, are a form of defeat for the United States, just as the 9/11 attacks and its alleged lack of success in Afghanistan and Iraq were also defeats."

November 15, 2011 
Osama has been described as "tender" and "kind" in a video released by the new head of al-Qaeda. The video (called "Days with the Imam: Part One") lasts about 30 minutes. It has been posted on jihadist websites. al-Zawahiri said that he'd created the video to show bin Laden's "human side" and tell people about his great loyalty. "People don't know that this man was tender, gentle, kind, with refined feelings, even when life was hard," al-Zawahiri says in the video, dressed in a white robe and turban and sitting in front of a green curtain. He recalls how Osama reacted when he received the news that some members of al-Zawahiri's family had been killed. With tears in his eyes, Osama came to see Ayman and hugged him. He adds that Osama was devoted to his children, paying great attention to ensuring that they were well-educated, despite constantly moving from place to place. Osama, he said, didn't want those who carried out the September 11 attacks to be forgotten. "Everyone close to him saw the fine and noble education in his children," he said, adding that Osama employed a teacher who would threaten to beat the children with a stick to teach them the Koran.

December 1, 2011 
al-Zawahiri claimed that al-Qaeda had kidnapped a 70-year-old American in Lahore in August. He demanded the release of Ramzi Yousef, Sheikh Omar Abdel Rahman, and others as well as the end of air strikes in Pakistan, Afghanistan, Yemen, Somalia, and Gaza in exchange for Warren Weinstein's release. al-Zawahiri also confirmed the death of Atiyah Abd al-Rahman, an al-Qaeda leader killed in a U.S. drone strike.

February 9, 2012 
al-Shabaab and al-Qaeda have announced their formal merger (according to a video disseminated online and translated by the SITE Institute). In the video, Moktar Ali Zubeyr pledges his organization's allegiance to al-Qaeda and Ayman al-Zawahiri accepts.

February 12, 2012 
al-Zawahiri in a video recording posted on the Internet on Sunday, urged Syrians not to rely on the West or Arab governments in their uprising to topple President Bashar al-Assad. In the 8-minute video (called "Onwards, Lions of Syria" and posted on an Islamist website), al-Zawahri also urged Muslims in Turkey, Iraq, Lebanon, and Jordan to come to the aid of Syrian rebels confronting Assad's forces. al-Zawahiri said, "A Muslim should help his brothers in Syria with all that he can, with his life, money, opinion, as well as information."

May 9, 2012 
In a seven-minute message video posted on a Jihadi website, Zawahiri rejected the US apology over the burning of Quran copies at a base in Afghanistan, urging all Muslims to support the Taliban.

May 11, 2012 
Al-Zawahiri released a video in which he encouraged Somali militants to fight on despite the challenges. He urged al-Shabab militants not to be deterred by U.S. drone attacks.

August 2, 2013 
Purported al-Zawahiri message criticizes Mohammad Morsi's ouster.

September 4, 2014 
He announced the creation of the branch on the Indian subcontinent to "raise the flag of jihad" across South Asia including India, Myanmar and Bangladesh. In the 55-minute video posted online, Zawahiri pledged renewed loyalty to Afghan Taliban leader Mullah Omar.

August 13, 2015 
In an audio recording al-Zawahiri gave condolences for the deceased Mullah Omar, and pledged allegiance to his successor, Akhter Mansour.

July 1, 2016 
In a video, al-Zawahri warns the United States of the "gravest consequences" if Muslim prisoners in that country are executed. He specifically names Dzhokhar Tsarnaev, who is facing the death sentence for his involvement in the 2013 Boston Marathon bombing.

July 8, 2019 
In a video titled, 'Don't forget Kashmir', Zawahiri urged unification of Jihadis and freeing from the clutches of unjustified Pakistan. He further criticized Pakistan and its role.

See also 
 Videos and audio recordings of Osama bin Laden
 Osama bin Laden
 al-Qaeda
 as-Sahab
 IntelCenter

References

External links 
 All al-Qaeda / as-Sahab video productions
 Guardian Unlimited List of all al-Qaida tapes.
 Concentrates on tape regarding Al-Qaeda attack on SS Norway in Miami, Memorial Day 2003.

Al-Qaeda propaganda